Maritime New Zealand (New Zealand Maritime Safety Authority) is a Crown entity and also a state maritime safety authority responsible for protecting the maritime transport sequence and marine environment within New Zealand and maintaining safety and security.

They define their vision as: "a maritime environment with minimum deaths, accidents, incidents and pollution as part of an integrated and sustainable transport system”.

Maritime New Zealand supports people by providing guidance and advice about Seafarer Certifications as well.

History
A maritime authority called the Marine Board was originally established in 1862 and controlled by the Customs Department until near the end of the nineteenth century, when it was renamed the Marine Department.

In 1907 the Marine Department acquired the 805 ton Royal Navy gun boat HMS Sparrow. This was converted into a training ship and renamed NZS Amokura. Over the next 14 years 527 boys trained in Amokura, 25 of them going on to naval service and most of the others into the merchant marine.

In 1972 the Marine Department was absorbed into the Ministry of Transport. In 1993 a Crown entity was established and called the Maritime Safety Authority before being subsequently rebranded as Maritime New Zealand in July 2005.

Current structure
The current entity employs approximately 190 staff. It is managed by a five-member board appointed by the responsible minister (Minister of Transport) under the Maritime Transport Act 1994.
One of its key responsibilities is the operation and maintenance of the lighthouses around New Zealand's coastline.

See also
 Royal New Zealand Coastguard
 Surf Life Saving New Zealand

References

External links
 

Water transport in New Zealand
New Zealand Crown agents
Maritime safety
Lighthouse organizations
1993 establishments in New Zealand
Organisations based in Wellington